Maria Latella (born 13 June 1957, in Reggio Calabria) is a multimedia journalist, columnist for Il Messaggero, Rome's leading daily newspaper, TV anchor woman and interviewer. She works for Sky Italia's SkyTg24, on the Sunday morning program "L'Intervista." The show was voted Italy's best political/current affairs TV program of 2012).

She has written several books, including "Tendenza Veronica", the first biography of Veronica Berlusconi. Latella was a political correspondent for the national newspaper "Corriere della Sera" and then editor of the weekly magazine "A". She also worked from Italy for Nbc.

Maria Latella is married, has a daughter and lives between Rome, Milan and Paris.

She received the America Award of the Italy-USA Foundation in 2019.

Publications

References 

Living people
1957 births
Italian journalists
People from Reggio Calabria